Upper Nubia is the southernmost part of Nubia, upstream on the Nile from Lower Nubia. It is so called because the Nile flows north, so it is further upstream and of higher elevation in relation to Lower Nubia.

The extension of Upper Nubia is rather ill-defined and depends on the researchers’ approach.

Geographical approach

Geographically speaking Upper Nubia designs the area between the Second and the Sixth cataracts of the Nile. Occasionally the term Middle Nubia is used to design the area between the Second and the Third cataract; in this case Upper Nubia begins at the Third cataract going upstream. 

Physiographic subdivisions of Upper Nubia alongside the Nile cataracts:

Political approach
Politically speaking Upper Nubia falls in present northern and central Sudan stretching from the Egyptian border south to present-day Khartoum at the confluence of White Nile and Blue Nile.

Historical approach

Historically speaking Upper Nubia comprises the areas of influence of the Nubian part of New Kingdom Egypt or the kingdom of Kush or Meroe. Connecting the Mediterranean world with inner Africa, Upper Nubia was crisscrossed by important trade routes and has been the cradle of diverse cultures.

References

Nubia
Nile
History of Nubia
Geography of Sudan